Nsah Mala (born Kenneth Toah Nsah) is a Cameroonian poet, writer, author of children's books and literary researcher. He writes in English, French, and Iteanghe-a-Mbesa (Mbesa language).

Biography

Early life and education 
Born in Mbesa (also Mbessa), Nsah Mala did his primary education in CBC School Mbesa. 

He wrote his first play in Form Two in Government Secondary School (GSS) Mbessa, and obtained his General Certificate of Education (GCE) Ordinary Level in 2007. He did high school education in CCAST Bambili where he obtained his GCE Advanced Level in 2009, emerging as the national overall best candidate in Literature in English which earned him an award from the Cameroon Association of English-Speaking Journalists (CAMASEJ). 
In 2012 he graduated from École Normale Supérieure (ENS) de Yaoundé and University of Yaoundé I. 
From 2016 to 2018, with an Erasmus Mundus Scholarship, he studied for the Erasmus Mundus Masters Crossways in Cultural Narratives at the University of Perpignan Via Domitia (France), University of St Andrews (UK), and Universidad de Santiago de Compostela (Spain).

In September 2018, he enrolled in a PhD programme in Comparative Literature at Aarhus University (Denmark). He earned the PhD degree on 11 March 2022 after a successful public defence of a doctoral dissertation entitled: "Can Literature Save the Congo Basin? Postcolonial Ecocriticism and Environmental Literary Activism." His dissertation had been co-supervised by Professor Mads Rosendahl Thomsen, Comparative Literature Department, and Associate Professor Peter Mortensen, English Department, both at Aarhus University. Nsah's doctoral assessment committee consisted of Professor Scott Slovic, English Department, University of Idaho (USA), Associate Professor Étienne-Marie Lassi, French Department, University of Manitoba (Canada), and Associate Professor Marianne Ping Huang, Comparative Literature, Aarhus University (Committee Chair). His doctoral thesis won the Prix de thèses francophones en Prospective 2022 (Prize for Francophone Theses in Foresight and Futures Studies) from la Fondation 2100 and l'Agence Universitaire de la Francophonie (AUF).

Writing career 
Nsah Mala wrote his first play in the second year (Form Two) of secondary education at GSS Mbessa. He published his first poetry collection entitled Chaining Freedom in 2012 and has gone on to publish three other poetry collections in English and one in French. He has published three picture books in Cameroon and France while his poems and stories appear in magazines and anthologies.

Constimocrazy: Malafricanising Democracy (2017), his fourth poetry collection, received reviews. Nelson Mlambo described it in Tuck Magazine as "a profound expression of Afro-talent and the personification of an Afropolitan voice." Global Arts and Politics Alliance (GAPA) observed that Nsah Mala "reminds despots that they are a minority and they thrive on using the masses to gain popularity and benefit from power".

In 2016, Nsah Mala's short story "Christmas Disappointment" was one of the ten winners of a competition organised by the Cameroonian Ministry of Arts and Culture. In December 2016, his short story "Fanta from America" received a special mention in a competition organised by Bakwa Magazine in Cameroon. His French poem "Servants de l'État" received a "mention spéciale du concours littéraire Malraux" (France) in December 2017. He attended the Caine Prize Writers' Workshop in Gisenyi, Rwanda, in March 2018. 

In summer 2020, POW! Kids Books acquired world rights (excluding Africa) to Nsah Mala's North American debut picture book entitled What the Moon Cooks to be published in spring 2021.

Publications

Poetry collections 
 (fr) Les Pleurs du mal, 2019, 
 (en) Constimocrazy: Malafricanising Democracy, 2017, 
 (en) If You Must Fall Bush, 2016, 
 (en) Bites of Insanity, 2015, 
 (en) Chaining Freedom, 2012,

Children's books 
 (en) Andolo: the Talented Albino, 2020, 
 (fr) Andolo: l'albinos talentueux, 2020, 
 (fr) Le petit Gabriel commence à lire, 2020, 
(en) Little Gabriel Starts to Read, 2020, ISBN 978-1-942876-71-7

Edited books 
 (co-edited with Mbizo Chirasha) Corpses of Unity – Cadavres de l'unité, 2020, 
 (co-edited with Tendai Rinos Mwanaka) Best New African Poets 2019 Anthology, 2020, 
 (co-edited with Tendai Rinos Mwanaka) Best New African Poets 2018 Anthology, 2018,

Short fiction 
 "Departure," Redemption Song and Other Stories, Caine Prize Anthology, 2018, 
 "America at Midnight," Kalahari Review, 2017
 "Stubborn Miniskirt," PAROUSIA Magazine, 2017

Essays 
 "Literature from the Congo Basin offers ways to address the climate crisis," The Conversation, 2022.
 "The virality of letters: the Covid-19 literary archive keeps growing," Corona Times, 2020.
 "Alleged corruption in academic appointments highlights Cameroon's PhD glut," Times Higher Education, 2020.
 "Comment expliquer la timide mobilisation de la jeunesse africaine pour le climat ?" The Conversation, 2019.

Peer-reviewed articles and book chapters 
 Nsah, Kenneth Toah. 2021. "The Ecopolitics of Water Pollution and Disorderly Urbanization in Congo-Basin Plays." Orbis Litterarum.
 Nsah, Kenneth Toah. 2021. "The Return of Bush Fallers: Cameroon Anglophone Fiction Responds to Clandestine Immigration." Postcolonial Text, vol. 16 no. 1, pp. 1–24.
 Nsah, Kenneth Toah. 2020. "Of Dogs, Horses and Buffalos in Cameroon: Companion Animals in Cameroonian Fiction." In Reading Cats and Dogs: Companion Animals in World Literature, eds. F. Besson et al. Lanham: Lexington Books, pp. 169–188. {{ISBN<978-1-7936-1106-2}}. 
 Nsah, Kenneth Toah. 2020. "When Trees Scream." DRAMA – Nordic Drama Pedagogical Journal.
 Nsah, Kenneth Toah: 2019. "The Screaming Forest: An Ecocritical Assessment of Le Cri de la forêt." Ecological In(ter)ventions in the Francophone World, eds. Anne-Rachel Hermetet and Stephanie Posthumus, special issue of Ecozon@: European Journal of Literature, Culture and Environment, vol. 10, no. 2, pp. 58–75.
 Nsah, Kenneth Toah. 2018. "'No Forest, No Water. No Forest, No Animals': An Ecocritical Reading of Ekpe Inyang's The Hill Barbers." Ecozon@: European Journal of Literature, Culture and Environment, vol. 9 no. 1, pp. 94–110.
 Nsah, Kenneth Toah. 2017. "Triple Marginality in Cameroon Anglophone Literature." In Rewriting Pasts, Imagining Futures: Critical Explorations of Contemporary African Fiction and Theatre, eds. Victor Gomia and Gilbert Ndi. Colorado: Spears Media Press, pp. 96–110. . 
 Nsah, Kenneth Toah. 2016. "Cameroon Professors Publish: A Reply to Nwanatifu Nwaco's 'Cameroon: Professors without Publications.'" Voice of Research, vol. 5 no. 2, pp. 53–59.
 Nsah, Kenneth Toah. 2016. "La métamorphose chez Kafka et Darriussecq: Une étude compare." Cahiers ivoiriens d’études comparées, vol. 7, pp. 33–52.
 Nsah, Kenneth Toah. 2015. "Eco-cultural Sensitivity in John Nkengasong's Njogobi Festival and Nol Alembong's Forest Echoes." Journal of English Language, Literature and Culture (JELLiC), vol. 4 no. 1, pp. 37–58. . 
 Nsah, Kenneth Toah. 2015. "Black Prophesies on White Soils and Ears: A Reading of Joyce Ashuntantang's 'The Clairvoyant.'" Modern Research Studies, vol. 2 no. 3, pp. 502–514.

References

See also
 Bernard Fonlon
Bate Bessong
Mungo Beti
Imbolo Mbue
 John Nkemngong Nkengasong
Patrice Nganang
Joyce Ashuntantang
 Mbesa 
Mbessa

Further reading
 Tanure Ojaide and Joyce Ashuntantang, Routledge, 29 April 2020

1988 births
Living people
People from Northwest Region (Cameroon)
Cameroonian writers
Cameroonian poets
Cameroonian academics